Marcos Bossy (18 April 1920 – 1987) was a Swiss basketball player. He competed in the men's tournament at the 1948 Summer Olympics and the 1952 Summer Olympics.

References

1920 births
1987 deaths
Swiss men's basketball players
Olympic basketball players of Switzerland
Basketball players at the 1948 Summer Olympics
Basketball players at the 1952 Summer Olympics
Place of birth missing